Corinna Miazga (17 May 1983 – 25 February 2023) was a German politician. Representing Alternative for Germany (AfD), Miazga served as a member of the Bundestag from the state of Bavaria from 2017 until her death in 2023.

Life and career

Miazga was born in Oldenburg in 1983. She was a lawyer by profession. She became member of German Bundestag after the 2017 German federal election. She was a member of the Committee on European Union Affairs.

In 2019, there were disputes over the head of the Bavarian AfD state party. Political influencer  Tom Rohrböck supported Miazga. He reportedly encouraged her to run for the state chairmanship. Rohrböck wrote to an unnamed competitor three days before the election: "I don't think you should be a candidate." A day later, he added: "You run into a trap. You don't get more than 30 percent." Shortly before the election to the state executive committee, the competitor actually withdrew his candidacy. Miazga later denied having won the state presidency due to Rohrböck's help.

In November 2020, Miazga said, she had breast cancer and would not be active as chairwoman of AfD Bavaria. In 2021 she got re-elected to the Bundestag on the state list coming second in Straubing. In October 2021, she lost the re-election as Bavarian party chairwoman to Stephan Protschka.

Miazga died of breast cancer on 25 February 2023, aged 39. She was replaced in the Bundestag by Rainer Rothfuß who moved up the list.

References

External links 

  
 Bundestag biography 

1983 births
2023 deaths
Deaths from cancer in Germany
Deaths from breast cancer
Members of the Bundestag for Bavaria
Female members of the Bundestag
21st-century German women politicians
Members of the Bundestag 2021–2025
Members of the Bundestag 2017–2021
People from Oldenburg (city)
Members of the Bundestag for the Alternative for Germany
21st-century German lawyers
German women lawyers